The Bangladesh National Film Award for Best Choreography is one of the highest film awards in Bangladesh. Since 1992, the awards have been given in the category of best choreography. The first award winner was Amir Hossain Babu. He and Masum Babul has won most awards in this category (3 times).

List of winners
Key

Notes

References

Sources

 
 
 
 
 
 

Choreography
National Film Award (Bangladesh)